Keroplatus militaris is a species of predatory fungus gnats in the family Keroplatidae.

References

Further reading

External links

 

Keroplatidae